Chandos may refer to:

Titles
 Duke of Chandos, and Baron Chandos, three English titles, all extinct
 Viscount Chandos, a modern title in the Peerage of the United Kingdom

Businesses
 Chandos Records
 Chandos Publishing

Other uses
 Chandos (name)
 Chandos Lake, Ontario, Canada
 County of Chandos, South Australia
 Chandos Mausoleum, in the London Borough of Harrow, England
 Chandos House, London
 Chandos Chair of Medicine and Anatomy, University of St Andrews, Scotland

See also
 Chandos Anthems, a collection of music written by George Frideric Handel
 Chandos portrait, a painting purportedly of William Shakespeare
 Duke of Buckingham and Chandos, title created for Richard Nugent Temple Grenville in 1822